The 1979 Atlanta Braves season was the 109th season for the franchise and their 14th in Atlanta.

Offseason 
 January 9, 1979: Brook Jacoby was drafted by the Braves in the 7th round of the 1979 Major League Baseball draft.
 February 22, 1979: Mike Davey was purchased from the Braves by the Seattle Mariners.
 March 31, 1979: Dave Campbell was traded by the Braves to the Montreal Expos for Pepe Frías.

Regular season

Season standings

Record vs. opponents

Death of GM Bill Lucas
On May 5, 1979, the Braves were staggered by the sudden death, at 43, of the club's general manager, Bill Lucas. The first African-American general manager in Major League Baseball, and the highest-ranking black executive in the game at the time of his death, he had been stricken at home May 2 with a massive cerebral hemorrhage, after watching a Braves' road-game victory on television.

Lucas had been the Braves' top baseball operations official since September 17, 1976, and on his watch the team introduced players who would be integral parts of its early 1980s contending teams—such as Dale Murphy, Bob Horner and Glenn Hubbard. During Lucas' term, the club had also hired Bobby Cox for his first term (1978–81) as manager.  Lucas had been a player and executive with the Braves since 1957; his sister, Barbara, also was the former wife of Hall of Famer and Braves' legend Henry Aaron.

Lucas was succeeded May 16 by John Mullen, 54, a vice president with the Houston Astros since 1967 but previously a longtime member of the Braves' management team in Boston, Milwaukee and Atlanta.  Mullen would serve as the Braves' general manager until his replacement, by Cox, in October 1985.

Notable transactions 
 April 3, 1979: Buzz Capra was released by the Braves.
 June 5, 1979: 1979 Major League Baseball draft
Paul Runge was drafted by the Braves in the 9th round.
Brett Butler was drafted by the Braves in the 23rd round. Player signed June 11, 1979.

Roster

Player stats

Batting

Starters by position 
Note: Pos = Position; G = Games played; AB = At bats; H = Hits; Avg. = Batting average; HR = Home runs; RBI = Runs batted in

Other batters 
Note: G = Games played; AB = At bats; H = Hits; Avg. = Batting average; HR = Home runs; RBI = Runs batted in

Pitching

Starting pitchers 
Note: G = Games pitched; IP = Innings pitched; W = Wins; L = Losses; ERA = Earned run average; SO = Strikeouts

Other pitchers 
Note: G = Games pitched; IP = Innings pitched; W = Wins; L = Losses; ERA = Earned run average; SO = Strikeouts

Relief pitchers 
Note: G = Games pitched; W = Wins; L = Losses; SV = Saves; ERA = Earned run average; SO = Strikeouts

Farm system 

LEAGUE CHAMPIONS: Greenwood

Awards and honors

League leaders 
Phil Niekro, National League leader, Losses

Notes

References 

1979 Atlanta Braves season at Baseball Reference
Atlanta Braves on Baseball Almanac

Atlanta Braves seasons
Atlanta Braves season
Atlanta